is the sixth single by Japanese singer/songwriter Chisato Moritaka. The lyrics were written by Moritaka and the music was composed by Hideo Saitō. The single was released by Warner Pioneer on February 25, 1989.

Background 
During a rehearsal in the middle of her first national tour in 1988, Moritaka suffered abdominal pain and had to be hospitalized for a week after being diagnosed with acute enteritis. Her doctor told her that the inflammation was caused by mental stress. As a result, the experience inspired her to write "The Stress".

Music video 
The music video features Moritaka as a waitress having to deal with all kinds of customers at a ramen restaurant while visualizing her stress as a ghostly entity watching her. Since the video's release, the waitress uniform has been one of her regular costumes on her live performances. The contents of the original 8" LaserDisc release were compiled in the 2000 DVD Chisato Moritaka DVD Collection No. 5: Mite/The Stress/17-sai.

Chart performance 
"The Stress" peaked at No. 19 on Oricon's singles chart and sold 40,000 copies, making it her first top-20 hit.

Other versions 
Remixes of "The Stress" were released in the 1989 greatest hits album Moritaka Land and the 1991 remix album The Moritaka.

This version is also included in Moritaka's 2015 self-covers DVD album Love Vol. 7.

The song was remixed by tofubeats in the 2014 collaboration album Chisato Moritaka with tofubeats: Moritaka Tofu.

Track listing 
All lyrics are written by Chisato Moritaka, except where indicated; all music is composed and arranged by Hideo Saitō, except where indicated.

Personnel 
 Chisato Moritaka – vocals
 Hideo Saitō – guitar, drum and synthesizer programming

Chart positions

Natsumi Abe version 

"The Stress" was covered by Natsumi Abe in 2006 as her seventh single. This version reached No. 14 in Oricon's singles chart. Abe performed an a cappella version of the song in a Georgia GABA commercial.

Track listing

Chart positions

References

External links 
Chisato Moritaka
  (Single)
  (Video)
 
 

Natsumi Abe
 

1989 singles
1989 songs
1989 video albums
2006 singles
Japanese-language songs
Chisato Moritaka songs
Songs with lyrics by Chisato Moritaka
Songs with music by Hideo Saitō (musician, born 1958)
Warner Music Japan singles